Tanglewood is a town located in north-eastern New South Wales, Australia, in the Tweed Shire.

References 

Suburbs of Tweed Heads, New South Wales